The S7 Shanghai–Chongming Expressway, commonly referred to as the Huchong Expressway and designated S7, is an expressway in the city of Shanghai, China. The entire route runs within Baoshan District in the city of Shanghai, and was originally designated A13.

Route

References 

Expressways in Shanghai